Mand or Maand is a style of singing in Rajasthan, used in folk songs. It is similar to the thumri and the ghazal.

Well known Mand singers include Allah Jilai Bai from Bikaner (awarded Padma Shri-1982 and Sangeet Natak Akademi Award-1988 in Folk Music), Mangi Bai Arya from Udaipur (awarded Sangeet Natak Akademi Award-2008 in Folk Music), and Gavari Bai from Jodhpur (awarded by Sangeet Natak Akademi Award-1975-76 and 1986 in Folk Music), Begam Batool from Jaipur (awarded Nari Shakti Puraskar-2021 in Bhajan & folk music).

References

 Rajasthani Music
  Award List
 in Other Forms of Music/Dance/Theatre

Rajasthani music
Hindustani music genres
Indian styles of music